= Bile-acid 7alpha-dehydroxylase =

Identifiers
- EC no.: 1.17.99.5

Databases
- IntEnz: IntEnz view
- BRENDA: BRENDA entry
- ExPASy: NiceZyme view
- KEGG: KEGG entry
- MetaCyc: metabolic pathway
- PRIAM: profile
- PDB structures: RCSB PDB PDBe PDBsum
Search
- PMC: articles
- PubMed: articles
- NCBI: proteins

Bile-acid 7alpha-dehydroxylase (EC 1.17.99.5, cholate 7alpha-dehydroxylase, 7alpha-dehydroxylase, bile acid 7-dehydroxylase) was thought to be an enzyme with systematic name deoxycholate:NAD^{+} oxidoreductase.

However, it was later shown that the dehydroxylation is carried out by seven different enzymes, catalyzing a total of 8 reactions. The enzymes are EC 6.2.1.7, EC 1.1.1.395, EC 1.3.1.115, EC 2.8.3.25, EC 4.2.1.106, EC 1.3.1.114, and EC 1.1.1.52.
